Sweet Tomatoes, operating as Souplantation in southern California, was a United States–based chain of all-you-can-eat buffet-style restaurants. The first location opened in 1978 in San Diego, California, where the company was headquartered. The company was incorporated as Garden Fresh Corp. in 1983. The company went public in 1995 but was taken private in 2004. The company, owned by Garden Fresh Restaurant Corporation, temporarily closed its 97 locations in March 2020 in response to government mandates related to the COVID-19 pandemic. On May 7, 2020, the closure was made permanent and the company filed for liquidation. However, the restaurant is to be reopened soon.

History
The first Souplantation restaurant opened on Mission Gorge Road in San Diego, in 1978. It was the idea of Dennis Jay, who was a bartender at Springfield Wagon Works, a pioneer in salad bars in El Cajon. Dennis's friends, John Turnbull and Scott King were opening their first Soup and Salad restaurant The Soup Exchange. Dennis was impressed with the new concept and introduced Steve Hohe, the Springfield Restaurant manager and Ron Demery, a bail bondsman and friend of John and Scott. Dennis, Steve and Ron decided to partner to create a parallel concept, the Souplantation. The two concepts grew side by side in a friendly, mutually supportive, yet competitive environment for several years. This restaurant and a second one in Point Loma were purchased in 1983 by Garden Fresh Restaurant Corp, founded by Michael Mack to operate the chain.

The company expanded across the American West and Southwest, and also opened locations in several Southeast states, including 23 restaurants in Florida. All of the restaurants were company-owned.

In 2005, an affiliate of the private investment firm Sun Capital Partners purchased Garden Fresh and with it the restaurant chains. In 2007, a Souplantation restaurant in Orange County, California was linked to an outbreak of E. coli. The restaurant closed temporarily while authorities investigated the outbreak.

In October 2016, Garden Fresh Restaurant Corp, the owner/operator of Souplantation and Sweet Tomatoes, filed for Chapter 11 bankruptcy. At the time Garden Fresh was nearly $175 million in debt. In January 2017, the company said it expected to emerge from bankruptcy later that month, following a sale of the company's assets to New York-based private investment firm Cerberus Capital Management L.P. and its partners. Garden Fresh anticipated it would wind up with "between 90 and 104 restaurants" and "significantly less debt". In 2017, Garden Fresh and its restaurant chains were purchased by the New York private investment firm Cerberus Capital Management.

In March 2020, all of the restaurants closed due to state and local government mandated shutdowns as a response to the COVID-19 pandemic. On May 7, 2020, the company announced it would be closing all Souplantation and Sweet Tomatoes locations permanently amid concerns that new  federal guidelines recommending an end to self-serve stations would prevent local health departments from granting permits to restaurants with salad bars and buffets.

Garden Fresh Restaurants, the parent company to both Souplantation and Sweet Tomatoes, filed for Chapter 7 liquidation with the U.S. Bankruptcy Court the following week on May 14. At the time of the announcement, the company had 4,400 employees and 97 restaurants.

In May 2022, a Souplantation restaurant not formally associated with the former company was announced. The location was set to open in La Mesa, California in mid-2022, but in July was delayed without a current opening date, and there are conflicting reports on whether the new restaurant will include recipes owned by the original company.

Format
Souplantation and Sweet Tomatoes restaurants specialized in fresh salads and soups, offering a large salad bar with ingredients to build your own plate of salad, homestyle soup options, and pasta, as well as bread, muffins, cornbread, and pizza, baked on the premises.

The salad bar offered a wide variety of vegetables, fruits, nuts, seeds, croutons, and other salad condiments, as well as a few prepared featured salads, which changed monthly. Other sections included up to eight soup selections, a small bakery offering muffins, cornbread, pizza Foccacia, and baked potatoes, a pasta section with a few different plates of pasta and sauces, and a dessert section offering fruit, puddings, and soft-serve ice cream. Featured menu items were rotated monthly often along a theme. Themes, named according to the type of food being served, included Asian, Greek, Italian, and Customer Favorites.

The company's home city of San Diego often served as a test market for new ideas and innovations, and was home to Souplantation's corporate offices. For example, some Souplantation and Sweet Tomatoes locations were open on Sunday mornings for breakfast. In 2011, the company launched its first quick-serve restaurant, called Souplantation Express, in Carlsbad, California.

In popular culture 
 Souplantation was the basis for the "Soup R' Crackers" chain that was a running joke on Party Down; the show's writers had originally planned to use the actual name of Souplantation, but the chain refused to allow it, necessitating the last-minute change to "Soup R' Crackers".
 The chain features prominently in the 1986 volleyball movie Spiker, with multiple scenes conspicuously taking place at a Souplantation.
 Souplantation was mentioned in Season 1, Episode 5 of The Big Bang Theory as Sheldon's Thursday restaurant.
 Randi suggests Souplantation sponsor her home laundry nook in her vlog on Season 2, Episode 15 of Call Me Kat.

See also 
 List of defunct restaurants of the United States
 Fresh Choice
 Golden Corral
 Sizzler
 Souper Salad

References

External links
 

Buffet restaurants
Restaurants established in 1978
Restaurants disestablished in 2020
Companies based in San Diego
Restaurants in San Diego County, California
Defunct companies based in California
Privately held companies based in California
1978 establishments in California
2020 disestablishments in California
Restaurants in Florida
Vegetarian cuisine
Vegan cuisine
2004 mergers and acquisitions
Companies that filed for Chapter 11 bankruptcy in 2016
Companies that have filed for Chapter 7 bankruptcy
2017 mergers and acquisitions
Cerberus Capital Management companies
Defunct restaurant chains in the United States
Restaurants disestablished during the COVID-19 pandemic